École Spéciale des Travaux Publics, du bâtiment et de l'industrie (ESTP Paris) is a French engineering school and  grande école located in Paris.

History

The ESTP was founded in 1891 by Léon Eyrolles and was officially recognized by the State in 1921. It is a general engineering school recognized for leading French higher education in the fields of construction and project management. ESTP Paris is one of the most prestigious civil engineering schools in France.
It has trained a total of 24,000 engineers and 7,000 construction site managers.
The school has also educated since 1891 site managers in building and public works in an undergraduate program.
In 1999 the school formed a partnership with Arts et Métiers ParisTech to offer a double-degree program.

Courses

The institution offers courses in building engineering, civil engineering, topography, surveying, electrical engineering granting diplomas and degrees for two- and three-year courses. The college was partly located on Boulevard Saint-Germain, in what has since become New York University's Paris campus, but entirely moved to Cachan, in the southern suburbs of Paris.
The college is open to English-speakers who want to study engineering in conjunction with French.

Alumni
Notable alumni include:

Patrick Bernasconi (born 1955), French business executive
Dominique Cerutti (born 1961), French businessman
Marcel Deviq (1907–1972), French engineer, businessman, and politician
Léon Eyrolles (1861–1945), French politician and entrepreneur, founder of the first ESTP
Menachem Mendel Schneerson (1902–1994), last rebbe of the Lubavitch Hasidic dynasty, philosopher, theologian, engineer, educator and writer
Moshé Feldenkrais (1904–84), Israeli engineer 
Marc de Garidel, French businessman
Nicolas Grunitzky (1913–69), second president of Togo 
Roger Guérillot (1904–71), French colonist of Ubangi-Shari
Ginette Hamelin (4 March 1913 – 14 October 1944), French engineer and architect; member of the French resistance; killed in a concentration camp
Saad Hassar (born 1953), Moroccan politician
Bruno Itoua (born 1956), Congolese politician
Harold Martin (born 1954), New Caledonian politician
Guillaume Sarkozy, French entrepreneur 
Jeanne Scelles-Millie (1900–93), French architectural engineer and author
Gilles Tonelli (born 1957), Monegasque engineer, diplomat and politician

External links

 ESTP Website 
 ESTP Website 
  Former site manager students website 

Engineering universities and colleges in France
Educational institutions established in 1891
1891 establishments in France